Laurel Mountain State Park is a  Pennsylvania state park in Ligonier Township, Westmoreland County and Jenner Township, Somerset County, Pennsylvania in the United States.

Geography
Several communications and broadcast towers are located on the top of Laurel Mountain, which serves the eastern Pittsburgh area and Greater Johnstown.

History
The park was opened as a private ski area in 1939 by General Richard K. Mellon and the Rolling Rock brewery from nearby Latrobe. It was one of the first ski areas in Pennsylvania and although World War II caused the ski resort to be temporarily closed, in the years following the war, it was the "Ski Capital of Pennsylvania". General Mellon leased the land to the state in 1963 and gave it to the state in 1964, when it officially became "Laurel Mountain State Park".

This state park is a ski resort that closed for business in 2005. The ski assets of the park were purchased by Seven Springs Mountain Resort in November 2008 with the goal of reopening the slopes. They would be operated under contract with PA-DCNR by the management of Seven Springs. Seven Springs signed a 10-year lease with PA-DCNR in November 2009. This allows the ski company to move ahead with plans to renovate and reopen the ski slopes.

Nearby state parks
The following state parks are within  of Laurel Mountain State Park:
Blue Knob State Park (Bedford County)
Keystone State Park (Westmoreland County)
Kooser State Park (Somerset County) 
Laurel Hill State Park (Somerset County)
Laurel Ridge State Park (Cambria, Fayette, Somerset, and Westmoreland counties)
Laurel Summit State Park (Westmoreland County)
Linn Run State Park (Westmoreland County)
Ohiopyle State Park (Fayette County)
Shawnee State Park (Bedford County)
Yellow Creek State Park (Indiana County)

References

External links

 

State parks of Pennsylvania
Parks in Somerset County, Pennsylvania
Parks in Westmoreland County, Pennsylvania
Laurel Highlands
Parks in the Pittsburgh metropolitan area
Protected areas established in 1964
Protected areas of Somerset County, Pennsylvania
Protected areas of Westmoreland County, Pennsylvania